(5 June 1912 – 27 September 1985) was a Japanese film and television actor most famous for his starring roles in jidaigeki. In 1936, he made his debut in movies with the film Aozura Roshi.
 
He ended his life by leaping from the top of a building in 1985. His final appearance in the film was Tampopo directed by Juzo Itami in 1985.

Filmography

Films
 Aozura Roshi (1936)
 (仇討崇禅寺馬場 Adauchi sōzenji baba) (1957)
 Akō Rōshi (赤穂浪士 Akō Rōshi) (1961)
 Castle of Owls (1963)
 The Magic Serpent (怪竜大決戦 Kairyū Daikessen) (1966)
 Eleven Samurai (1967) : Chief Retainer Akiyoshi Gyobu
 Yakuza's Law: Yakuza Keibatsushi: Rinchi (1969) : Tomozo
 Kagero-za (1981) : Shishō
 Tampopo (1985) : Noodle professor

Television
 Akō Roshi (1964) : Horiuchi
 Minamoto no Yoshitsune (1966)
 Ten to Chi to (1969) – Itagaki Nobukata
 Kunitori Monogatari (1973) – Takeda Shingen
 Shinsho Taikōki (1973) – Shimizu Muneharu
 Amigasa Jūbei (1974-75) - Okuda Magodayu
 Oshin (1983) as Eizo

References

External links 
 https://www.imdb.com/name/nm0645207/

1912 births
1985 deaths
Japanese male film actors
Suicides by jumping in Japan
20th-century Japanese male actors
1985 suicides
People from Hiroshima Prefecture
Actors from Hiroshima Prefecture
People from Hiroshima
Actors from Hiroshima